Motleyia is a monotypic genus of flowering plants belonging to the family Rubiaceae. It only contains one known species, Motleyia borneensis J.T.Johanss.

It is native to Borneo.
 
The genus name of Motleyia is in honour of James Motley (1822–1859), a Yorkshireman closely associated with South Wales and Borneo. The Latin specific epithet of borneensis means "coming from Borneo".
Both the genus and species were first described and published in Blumea Vol.32 on pages 149–150 in 1987.

References

Rubiaceae
Rubiaceae genera
Plants described in 1987
Flora of Borneo